Mallepally Laxmaiah is Indian Telugu language journalist. He worked with Vaartha and Andhra Jyothi newspaper before quitting in 2009 to participate in Telangana movement and also was one of the creators of HMTV television Telugu news channel.

Career
Mallepally Laxmaiah worked with major newspapers. He has been an adviser to the Telangana Rashtra Samithi since its inception. 
He is also the Co-Chairman of the Joint Action Committee on Telangana which is spearheading the non-political movement.
He is coordinator for Center for Dalit Studies.

References

Indian male journalists
Telugu writers
Living people
1956 births
Journalists from Telangana